Florian Kunz (born 22 February 1972, in Leverkusen) is a former field hockey defender from Germany. He was the captain of the side which won the 2002 Men's Hockey World Cup. He played a total of 228 caps for the national team from 1992 until 2004.

References

External links

 Hockey Olympia Germany
 World’s best but modest to the core - The Tribune

1972 births
Living people
German male field hockey players
Male field hockey defenders
Field hockey players at the 2000 Summer Olympics
2002 Men's Hockey World Cup players
Field hockey players at the 2004 Summer Olympics
Olympic field hockey players of Germany
Sportspeople from Leverkusen
Olympic medalists in field hockey
Medalists at the 2004 Summer Olympics
Olympic bronze medalists for Germany
21st-century German people